The Sandia Peak Tramway is an aerial tramway located adjacent to Albuquerque, New Mexico. It stretches from the northeast edge of the city to Sandia Peak on the ridge line of the Sandia Mountains and has the world's third longest single span. It is the longest aerial tram in the Americas, and was the longest in the world from 1966 until being surpassed in 2010 by the Wings of Tatev in Armenia.

History

The Sandia Peak Ski Company was cofounded by balloonist Ben Abruzzo and Robert Nordhaus (father of Nobel Prize-winning economist William Nordhaus), and Nordhaus was inspired to build a tram to the ski slope after seeing other trams during a trip to Europe. Bell Engineering of Lucerne, Switzerland, constructed the tramway. Entering service on May 7, 1966, the tram makes 10,500 trips per year. New tram cars were installed in 1986, and new track cables in 2009. New tram cars were again installed in May 2016.

New Year 2022 incident
On New Year's Eve, 2021, a winter storm caused the emergency cable to ice over and droop onto the track cables, causing the tramway to stop mid-course. 19 employees from the restaurant TEN 3 at the top terminal and 1 Sandia Peak Tram Cabin Operator , were aboard the downhill tram car evacuating the restaurant due to the approaching storm, and were trapped for over 17 hours, likewise 1 cabin operator was stranded in the uphill tram car too. All were rescued on the afternoon of January 1st, 2022. Members of the Albuquerque Mountain Rescue Council helped the passengers rappel down the upper tower and hike to a point where they could be rescued by a Bernalillo County Sheriff's Office helicopter. Ongoing wind and snow hampered the rescue operations. All passengers and crew were rescued without injury.

Description

The tram is a type known as a "double reversible jigback aerial tramway," where "jigback" implies that when one tram car is ascending, the other is descending. Its two cars are capable of carrying 50 passengers each and have numerous safety and backup systems, such as multiple emergency braking systems and a grounding system that ensures the safety of passengers in the event of a lightning strike. Approximately four "flights" leave every hour from the base and top termini.
 
The tramway has only two support towers.

The longest span is between the second tower and the top terminal. This span passes over Domingo Baca Canyon, part of which is referred to as TWA Canyon. This is the site of the crash of TWA Flight 260 on February 19, 1955, in which the lives of all 16 passengers and crew were lost. While much of the wreckage was removed during construction of the tramway, some still remains on the canyon floor and may be visible to riders of the tram.

Activities on top

At the top of Sandia Peak there are many year-round recreational options. The restaurant, TEN 3 (stylized as 10|3), is directly adjacent to the top tram terminal and offers scenic views to the west. Many Forest Service trails offer recreational hiking, backpacking and nature hikes to visitors. Additionally, the tram terminal is located at the top of Sandia Peak Ski Area, which is on the opposite side of the mountain from the tramway and the city. Bikes cannot be taken onto tram cars. There is no public transportation in this area of Albuquerque; the tram is accessible only by car, bicycle, or foot.

Notes

External links

 Sandia Peak Tramway official site

Tourist attractions in Albuquerque, New Mexico
Transportation in Albuquerque, New Mexico
Aerial tramways in the United States
Buildings and structures in Albuquerque, New Mexico
1966 establishments in New Mexico